Al Tesch (January 27, 1891 – August 3, 1947), nicknamed "Tiny", was a baseball player who was positioned at second base for the Brooklyn Tip-Tops in 8 games in 1915.

Teams
 Brooklyn Tip-Tops 1915

Sources

Baseball players from Jersey City, New Jersey
Major League Baseball second basemen
1891 births
1947 deaths
Brooklyn Tip-Tops players
Brantford Red Sox players
Brockton Shoemakers players
Boyne City Boosters players
Little Rock Travelers players
Flint Vehicles players